Monday Creek Township is one of the fourteen townships of Perry County, Ohio, United States.  The 2000 census found 671 people in the township.

Geography
Located in the southwestern corner of the county, it borders the following townships:
Jackson Township - north
Pike Township - northeast corner
Salt Lick Township - east
Coal Township - southeast
Falls Township, Hocking County (northeastern portion) - south
Marion Township, Hocking County - west
Rush Creek Township, Fairfield County - northwest corner

No municipalities are located in Monday Creek Township.

Name and history
Monday Creek Township was organized in 1823, and named after Monday Creek. It is the only Monday Creek Township statewide.

Government
The township is governed by a three-member board of trustees, who are elected in November of odd-numbered years to a four-year term beginning on the following January 1. Two are elected in the year after the presidential election and one is elected in the year before it. There is also an elected township fiscal officer, who serves a four-year term beginning on April 1 of the year after the election, which is held in November of the year before the presidential election. Vacancies in the fiscal officership or on the board of trustees are filled by the remaining trustees.

References

External links
County website

Townships in Perry County, Ohio
Townships in Ohio
1823 establishments in Ohio
Populated places established in 1823